Hectorspruit, officially Emjejane, is a small farming town situated between Kaapmuiden and Komatipoort on a southern tributary of the Crocodile River in Mpumalanga, South Africa. The farms in the region produce sugarcane, subtropical fruit and vegetables. The stream is named after a dog belonging to S de Kock, chief surveyor of the Pretoria - Delagoa Bay railway line.

Hamlet some 30 km west of Komatipoort and 80 km north-east of Pigg's Peak. The hamlet is named after a tributary of the Crocodile River, the Hectorspruit, which is said to take its name from a hunting-dog which died there from a tsetse fly bite.

The hamlet was officially renamed in 2005 to Emjejane (SiSwati) after late Chief Mjejane Ngomane.

References

Populated places in the Nkomazi Local Municipality